Denis Kulakov may refer to:

 Denis Kulakov (sport shooter) (born 1982), Russian sport shooter
 Denys Kulakov (born 1986), Ukrainian football player